Petrine may refer to:
 Saint Peter the Apostle, in Christianity, as in a Petrine text
 Petrine Cross
 Petrine ministry, the office of the Pope
 Peter the Great, in Russia, as in the Petrine Revolution
 The post-Petrine era, the House of Romanov after Peter the Great, or the Holstein-Gottorp-Romanov Dynasty
 Petrine Baroque, a style of architecture, particularly rich in Saint Petersburg
  Petrine (Fire Emblem: Path of Radiance), in Fire Emblem: Path of Radiance, one of the Four Riders of Daein and one of the game's more prominent adversaries